Morehouse Parish School Board is a school district headquartered in an unincorporated area of Morehouse Parish, Louisiana, United States, near the city of Bastrop, the parish seat.

The district serves Morehouse Parish.

Bastrop High School prayer controversy 
In 2011, graduating senior Damon Fowler objected to prayer at the Bastrop High School graduation exercises, claiming a looming violation of the First Amendment to the Constitution of the United States. The ACLU of Louisiana asked the school not to include a prayer in the May 20 graduation. At the Thursday night rehearsal for the graduation, senior Sarah Barlow included a prayer that explicitly mentioned Jesus, and during the graduation, student Laci Rae Mattice led people in the Lord's Prayer before a moment of silence. The school says that Mattice was told not to include a prayer. Fowler stated that after his objections became public he was ostracized by other students. In 2012, Fowler received the Humanist Pioneer Award from the American Humanist Association.

Schools

6-12 schools
 Delta High School  (Unincorporated area)

High schools
 Bastrop High School  (Bastrop)

K-8 schools
 Beekman Junior High School (Unincorporated area)

1-8 schools
 Morehouse Magnet School (Bastrop)

7-8 schools
 Morehouse Junior High School (Bastrop)

PK-6 schools
 Henry V. Adams Elementary School (Bastrop)
 Cherry Ridge Elementary School (Unincorporated area)
 East Side Elementary School (Bastrop)
 Pine Grove Elementary School (Unincorporated area)
 Southside Elementary School (Bastrop)

3-6 schools
 Carver Elementary School (Bastrop)

PK-2 schools
 Oak Hill Elementary School (Bastrop)

Alternative
 Bastrop Learning Academy (Bastrop)

References

External links
 Morehouse Parish Schools

School districts in Louisiana
School Board